The Trade Centre Group is a used car sales company in the United Kingdom.

History

Outside of Wales
The company opened their first showroom in England in early 2017 known as "The Trade Centre UK".

References

Organisations based in Wales
1999 establishments in Wales
Used car market